Princess Maria Pia of Bourbon-Parma (born Princess Maria Pia of Savoy; 24 September 1934) is the eldest daughter of Umberto II of Italy and Marie-José of Belgium. She is the older sister of Princess Maria Gabriella of Savoy, Vittorio Emanuele, Prince of Naples, and Princess Maria Beatrice of Savoy.

Biography

Maria Pia Elena Elisabetta Margherita Milena Mafalda Ludovica Tecla Gennara di Savoia was the first-born child of the Prince and Princess of Piedmont, born in Naples, Italy in 1934. Her parents, married since 1930, were unhappy together, as her mother confessed in an interview many years later (On n'a jamais été heureux, "We were never happy"), and separated after the Italian monarchy was abolished by plebiscite on 2 June 1946. Exiled, the family gathered briefly in Portugal, and she and her three younger siblings soon went with their mother to Switzerland while their father remained in the Portuguese Riviera.

She lives in Neuilly-sur-Seine, near Paris, and Palm Beach, Florida.

Marriages and issue

On the royal cruise of the yacht, Agamemnon, hosted by Queen Frederica of Greece on 22 August 1954, she met and later married Prince Alexander of Yugoslavia (1924–2016), son of Prince Paul of Yugoslavia and Princess Olga of Greece and Denmark. The two were married on 12 February 1955 at Cascais in Portugal, where Maria Pia's father was living in exile.

Three years after their wedding, Maria Pia gave birth to the couple's set of fraternal twin sons. Another set of twins was born to Maria Pia during the marriage five years later, this time a girl and boy:

 Prince Dimitri Umberto Anton Peter Maria of Yugoslavia (born 18 June 1958)
 Prince Michael Nicolas Paul George Maria of Yugoslavia (born 18 June 1958)
 Prince Sergius "Serge" Wladimir Emanuel Maria of Yugoslavia (born 12 March 1963); married Sophia de Toledo on 6 November 1985. They divorced in 1986. He was remarried to Eleonora Rajneri on 18 September 2004. He has a child with Christiane Galeotti:
 Umberto Emmanuel Dimitri Karađorđević (born 3 February 2018 in Monaco)
 Princess Helene Olga Lydia Tamara Maria of Yugoslavia (born 12 March 1963); married Thierry Gaubert on 12 January 1988. The couple divorced and she remarried to Stanislas Fougeron on 12 March 2018. 
 Milena Maria Pia Angelique Armaule Gaubert (born 1988)
 Nastasia Marie José Tania Vanessa Isabelle Gaubert (born 1991)
 Leopold Umberto Armand Michel Gaubert (born 1997)

The couple were divorced in 1967.

In 2003, Maria Pia was married to Prince Michel of Bourbon-Parma (1926–2018), son of Prince René of Bourbon-Parma and Princess Margaret of Denmark, whose marriage with Princess Yolande de Broglie-Revel had been annulled and with whom he has five dynastic children, also being the father of a child born out of wedlock in 1977, Amélie de Bourbon de Parme (wed in 2009 to Igor Bogdanoff). Through him she was a sister-in-law of Queen Anne of Romania. Maria Pia's ex-husband, Prince Alexander was also remarried, to Princess Barbara of Liechtenstein, a cousin of that principality's monarch, and they had one son, Prince Dušan Paul.

Select bibliography

References

External links

Royalty visits the Hoover Institution Archives 

1934 births
Living people
Italian princesses
Princesses of Bourbon-Parma
Princesses of Savoy
Recipients of the Order of Saints Maurice and Lazarus
Knights Grand Cross of the Order of Saints Maurice and Lazarus
Knights of Malta
Chevaliers of the Ordre des Arts et des Lettres
Italian exiles
Daughters of kings